Flavobacterium filum is a Gram-negative and non-motile  bacterium from the genus of Flavobacterium which has been isolated from activated sludge from a wastewater treatment plant from Pohang in Korea.

References

 

filum
Bacteria described in 2007